Alluri is an Indian surname. Notable people with the surname include:

Alluri Satyanarayana Raju, Indian independence activist and politician
Alluri Sitarama Raju  (1897 – 1924), Indian revolutionary
Alluri Subhash Chandra Bose (born 1940), Indian politician
Shriram Alluri, Indian-born musician

See also
Alluri Seetarama Raju (film), 1974 Indian Telugu-language biographical film

Alluri (film), 2022 Indian Telugu-language Action-Crime-Drama film